Releasing Eskimo was a small record label in Sweden. The label released music by Aube, Brainbombs, Killer Bug and Merzbow among others.

See also 
 List of record labels

External links
 Official site

Swedish record labels
Noise music record labels
Experimental music record labels